Johnny Whitworth (born October 31, 1975) is an American actor. He is known for his roles as A.J. in Empire Records (1995), as Donny Ray Black in Francis Ford Coppola's The Rainmaker (1997), as Vernon Gant in Limitless (2011), as Blackout in the Marvel superhero film Ghost Rider: Spirit of Vengeance (2011), and as Cage Wallace in The CW's series The 100.

Life and career
Whitworth's early years were spent in his birthplace, Charleston, South Carolina, with his mother. As his parents were divorced, he eventually chose to live with his father in Plano, Texas. But following that he moved to Los Angeles with his mother and at the age of 15 started his acting career with a guest appearance on Party of Five in 1994. His debut in movies was with Bye Bye Love in 1995. That same year, he played A.J. in the film Empire Records.

Whitworth quit acting after his first few movies but then made a comeback in 1997's The Rainmaker He had a recurring role on the CBS crime drama CSI: Miami, where he played bad-boy Detective Jake Berkeley, a love interest of Calleigh Duquesne. The story line swiftly made Whitworth's character a controversial one, as his competition for Duquesne was long-time CSI agent Eric Delko. From the end of Season 5 and throughout Season 6, Berkeley was no longer an ATF agent but a Miami-Dade homicide detective working with the CSI team. Whitworth returned in the first episode of Season 7 and again in the 21st episode of Season 8. This was his last appearance.

In 2003 he costarred in MTV's musical adaptation of Wuthering Heights, which was a modern take on the classic novel. In 2007, Whitworth appeared in the film 3:10 to Yuma, and in 2009 appeared in Gamer. He later appeared in the films Locked In and Limitless. He also played the villain Blackout in the 2011 film Ghost Rider: Spirit of Vengeance and Griffin Cavenaugh in the thriller Pathology.

From 2014 to 2015, Whitworth had the recurring role of Cage Wallace in The CW's series The 100. In 2015, Whitworth had a recurring role in NBC series Blindspot.

Filmography

Film

Television

References

External links
 
 

20th-century American male actors
21st-century American male actors
American male film actors
American male television actors
Living people
Male actors from Charleston, South Carolina
1975 births